Peyzac-le-Moustier is a commune in the Dordogne department in Nouvelle-Aquitaine in southwestern France. It is known for the nearby archeological site of Le Moustier, which is a UNESCO World Heritage Site.

Population

See also
Roque Saint-Christophe
 Le Moustier
Communes of the Dordogne department
Limeuil (prehistoric site)

References

Communes of Dordogne